Judo at the 2000 Summer Paralympics consisted of seven men's events.

Medal table

Participating nations

Medallists

References 

 

2000 Summer Paralympics events
2000
Paralympics
Judo competitions in Australia